Harry Seidel (April 2, 1938 – August 8, 2020)was a former professional cyclist who helped people to escape from the German Democratic Republic (GDR) through tunnels in West Berlin. After he got caught in 1962, the highest court under notorious judge Heinrich Toeplitz of the GDR sentenced him to life in prison in a show trial. He was incarcerated at the Brandenburg-Görden Prison. In 1966, the Federal Republic of Germany bought him out of prison.

References

External links 
 

1938 births
2020 deaths
East German male cyclists
Cyclists from Berlin
German male cyclists